David Min (born 23 June 1999) is a Dutch professional football player who plays as a forward for Telstar, on loan from RKC Waalwijk.

Club career
On 15 August 2022, Min was loaned to Telstar for the season.

References

External links

 Career stats & Profile - Voetbal International

1999 births
Living people
Dutch footballers
Association football forwards
RKC Waalwijk players
SC Telstar players
Eredivisie players
Footballers from Zaanstad